Matlatzinca, or more specifically San Francisco Matlatzinca, is an endangered Oto-Manguean language of Western Central Mexico. The name of the language in the language itself is pjiekak'joo. The term "Matlatzinca" comes from the town's name in Nahuatl, meaning "the lords of the network." At one point, the Matlatzinca groups were called "pirindas," meaning "those in the middle."

The first groups of Matlatzincas likely settled in the Toluca Valley around the 12th century. After other groups began to settle around and within it, the Matlatzinca territory became an important hub of economic activity. The economic activity prompted the Nahuatl language to become the dominant language in the area. At this point, Matlatzinca communities began losing their language.

Since the Spanish conquest of the Aztec Empire, the group has lost much of their territory. As Franciscan orders began arriving in the territory and evangelizing to the natives, missionaries were forced to learn the languages and create grammars. In 1565 before epidemics ravaged the native populations of New Spain, it was estimated that there were perhaps 180,000 people who spoke Matlatzinca.

There are fewer and fewer speakers of San Francisco Matlatzinca. Even in a majority bilingual population, the use of Spanish is becoming increasingly dominant. In 2020, San Francisco Matlatzinca was spoken by around 1,245 people. Even though Matlatzinca is a moribund language, it is recognized as an official language of Mexico. At any one time, about half the population is in the village of San Francisco Oxtotilpan and half away in Mexico City.

Phonology

Consonants
There are 16 phonemes in the consonant inventory of San Francisco Matlatzinca. In some transcriptions, the IPA symbol is replaced with the segments seen in the brackets.

Vowels
There are 7 vowel phonemes in San Francisco Matlatzinca.

There are no glides inherent to these vowels, so it's as if they resemble Spanish vowels. There is the tendency to drop word-final vowels if it occurs after a voiceless stop or affricate. For example, /i/ may get left off the end of a word if it is unstressed and appears after a voiceless consonant.

Syllable structure
Every syllable is structured around one of the vowels listed. Neither an onset or a coda is required of a syllable generally, though there are restrictions on whether an onset or coda is necessary depending on placement of the syllable within the word. 

For example, the first syllable of a word may begin with a vowel or a consonant. In this case, the syllabic vowel can be preceded with a consonant or not or may be followed by a consonant or not. The possibilities for word-initials can be summed up in these possible syllables: V-, CV-, VC-, CVC-. 

Word-final syllables must always have an onset consisting of one consonant or a two-consonant cluster: -CV or -CCV. This also means that all words will end in a syllabic vowel, never a consonant 

Syllables found in the middle of words will always have an onset of either one consonant or a two-consonant cluster. The syllable can be open, meaning there is no coda of consonants after the syllabic vowel, or closed with consonants on both sides. However, if the onset contains a cluster, then the vowel cannot be closed. Additionally, consonant clusters have a maximum of two consonants and only occur in onsets, never codas, of the syllable. The possibilities for these syllables found in the middle of words can be summed up in these possible syllables: -CV-, -CVC-, -CCV. 

Examples of these structures are t'etəʃna "my clothing" and inʃtəti "a sheep."

Stress
There are no phonemes that have specific prosodic qualities ascribed to them, but there are patterns to be found nonetheless. Andrews and Shell (1945) notice that there seems to be a pattern of a stress on alternating syllables, as seen in the word 'meka'ka. Frequently, the vowels in these stressed syllables will become lengthened. They also notice that this pattern of alternating stresses does not continue across phrases, but only within individual words, noting its usefulness for determining word boundaries.  

However, pitch and tone do hold lexical, morphological, and syntactic importance. Tone sandhi occurs in Matlatzinca, which is a pitch-accent language, just as it does in many Oto-Manguean languages.

Matlatzinca has a high and a low tone, but as 4 phonetically distinct tones. The high and low tones are often interpreted as a pattern of stress and lack of stress, though stresses can occur both on high and low tones. Tonal changes often occur when Matlatzinca combines 2 or more words, such as tahnə:bi "I danced" with a low tone on the middle syllable becoming tahnə:bi bək'i "I danced here" with the same syllable converting to a high tone add the bi becoming a low tone. Some other tendencies are that the tone of the syllable will be drawn towards the one that follows it, such as in tuko:ti mbaʔni "She shut the house". When the word ends with a low tone before a high tone, the high tone tends to be dropped to a mid tone. If the end of the word ends in a low tone, the last syllable may drop to a phonetic sub-low tone. Finally, a falling glide may occur at the final syllable of a word, such as in intawi "water." In general, tones will be affected by the syllables that follow.

Phonological processes

Here are examples of only some of the phonological processes that occur in Matlatzinca: 

Consonants in Matlatzinca undergo debuccalization such as with [kʰ, pʰ, mʰ] or will be accompanied by a glottal stop [ʔ] on either side of the consonant. This can be seen in ɾutʰan "bird."

The bilabial phonemes /p, b, m/ will become labialized and take on the approximant /w/ when they come before the central vowels /ɨ, ə/ becoming the allophones [pʷ, βʷ, mʷ], such as in pä'chi, transcribed phonetically as ['pʷəʔtʃi].

The voiced alveolar nasal /n/ is apico-alveolar normally, but becomes velarized [ŋ] before a velar consonant (ink′aró [ʔiŋkʔaro]), palatalized [ñ] before a palatal consonant (inyá [ʔiña]), and voiceless when alongside /h/ (nínhupí [′niNu′pi]). 

The phoneme /s/ becomes an affricate resembling [t͡s] when it is accompanied by a glottal stop as in s′íná, transcribed as [′tsʔina].

The phoneme /r/ will become a trill when it accompanies /h/, as in rhántá. It becomes a dental retroflex stop [d] after a nasal consonant, as in s′énru.

The phoneme /b/ becomes labiodental [f] when in combination with /h/, becomes a stop [b] when accompanied by a nasal consonant, and is a fricative [β] everywhere else.

The phonemes /y, l, w, m, n/ all become voiceless when in groups with /h/.

The consonants /k, ch, s/ become voiced when in groups of other consonants.

Morphology

Prefixes and Suffixes

Nouns
The stem frequently takes a few different forms such as CV, CVC, CVV, CVVC, and CVʰCVC. The only obligatory prefixes that are always attached to the stem are for the number and gender of the possessor. For example, the marked gender plural is used in ʔinnetʰami, meaning “coin.” When there is an indefinite possessor, the suffix -ta is used, such as in ʔinemoota meaning “someone′s feet.” 

An example of possessive prefixes is in the word ʔimbot′ono, meaning “our head.” The possessive prefix will come after the number and gender prefixes. Given that the prefixes for plural 2nd and 3rd person are the same, tone is often used to distinguish between the two.

Matlatzinca also has appreciative prefixes that preceded the stem but come after the prefixes for the number/gender and possessive. Here are some examples:
ba meaning “long”
maa- and tee- both meaning “big”
t′o and tʰe both meaning “small”

Verbs
The verb system is generally aligned with a nominative-accusative system. Verb stems often take the forms of either CVC, CVV, CVVC, or CVʰVC. Verbs include affixes for time-aspect-mode, voice, and the number of subject and object arguments. The affix for time-aspect-mode will precede the stem of the word. This can be seen in the word kironnəʰə neʃuwi, meaning “the women dance,” where ron indicates the third person accusative.

When speaking about an object, the suffix -ki is used to mark the first person singular, such as in ki rontosetiki, and -ø is used to mark third person singular, such as in ki tuʔuri.

As seen in both the previous examples, the morpheme ki is used in most verb constructions, but its meaning and function is not very clear. It appears with morphemes concerning time-aspect-mode, generally preceding the verb, but it does not come before determinant phrases, adjectives, adverbs, or prepositions.

Allomorphy
Motijo proposes that the morpheme ʔin is a determiner that indicates a noun. It doesn′t form part of the noun, and adjectives can come between that and the noun. wee is mutually exclusive of ʔin, though it is very similar and still a determiner. It is mostly used in noun phrases where human nouns are used, implicating a social dunction, while ʔin is used in all the other cases. ʔin also appears regardless of the number of the noun, but wee does not appear in nouns that are dual or plural. Furthermore, ʔin can take on different allomorphs such as [ʔiN], [ʔi], or [N]. The final consonant /n/ may be realized as [m], [n], [ɲ], or [ŋ]. The final consonant may also fall off, and the determiner becomes ʔi.

Syntax 

Based on data provided by Escalante and Hernández, Matlatzinca utilizes an SVO word order just as English does. For example,
wetowá'a ku'íwi meaning, "the boy is sleeping" has a subject wetowá'a for "the boy" preceding a verb ku'íwi for "sleeping" in the present tense.
kach'í iht'ahki imhéwi meaning, "you always ask me for tortillas" demonstrates a more complex sentence structure containing a subject, verb, and object.
kach'í is the subject, translating to the 2nd person singular subject "you". 
iht'ahki is the verb (though containing many affixes). Within the verb is communicated the subject of the verb (ih), that the verb is a transitive verb (-tu), the verb stem itself (-aati), and finally the 1st person singular indirect object (-ki).
imhéwi is the object of the phrase, translating to "tortillas." The prefix im- denotes a definite article attached to the noun object.

Within the noun phrase, there are certain ordering rules:
The article will always come before the noun, such as in imbáani meaning "house," where the prefix im- is the definite singular article.
An adjective will always come before the noun in a noun phrase, such as in inch'əmi meaning "the red chili," where -ch'ə designates the chili as red.
When the noun is present in a certain number, then the number denotation will always come after the noun, such as in the phrase síní tenówewi meaning, "two dogs." The second word tenówewi indicates that there is two of the dogs.
Indication of a possessive will come before the noun, such as in wetheriwí meaning "my son," where the affix -the- means "my."

Case Marking
Matlatzinca mostly follows the system nominative-accusative system. There is also a small class of verbs that follow an active-stative alignment, but there is not enough in the existing corpus to infer the general difference for when each case is used. Examples of different case markings can be seen in the Morphology section above.

Notes

Indigenous languages of Mexico
Mesoamerican languages
Matlatzinca
Matlatzinca
Matlatzinca